A shaped compact disc is a non-circular compact disc. Examples include business card CDs, CDs in the shape of a star, a map of a country, interview material and more. These discs are usually made for marketing purposes and are properly read by most CD-ROM drives (and audio CD players, although custom-shaped CDs tend to contain less data). There are many companies that sell CDs with custom shapes.

Unlike Mini CDs, which are smaller, but still circular versions of normal CDs, custom CDs can be any number of shapes, even more complicated shapes like gears with dozens of teeth, but are generally smooth and with rounded edges, such as ovals or rounded rectangles. A logo can be printed on a shaped CD, in the same way common audio CDs and CD-ROMs are labeled.

Shaped CDs are produced in one of two ways.  A special mold can be made and used to "stamp" CDs (or DVDs) as part of the precision injection molding process that is used to make CDs and DVDs.  Because of the initial cost involved in setting up this process, it is usually used for mass production.  For the same reason, this is generally restricted to the production of read-only CDs and DVDs (CD-ROM or DVD-ROM).  Recordable CDs and DVDs (CD-R or DVD-R or DVD+R) are not generally available except in standard shapes including rectangular.  The second method to produce a shaped CD or DVD is to produce a normal CD-ROM or DVD-ROM and cut it to the desired shape. This method works only for CD-ROM.  It will not work for CD-R because the plastic used to produce CD-R tends to splinter when cut.  It is important that two criteria be met for a shaped disc to function properly.  First, the shape must be balanced to avoid problems when it begins to spin.  Second, at least three points of the outer edge must touch either the outer 12 cm diameter rim of the player's tray where standard size discs fit or the inner rim where 8 cm diameter mini discs fit.

Data can only be recorded on sections of a Shaped CD that form uninterrupted circular tracks. Other parts of the shape are purely decorative - but are still often finished to the same appearance as a CD. They appear silver and reflective on the data side of the CD, even though they contain no actual valid bytes and cannot be read.

History
The Flaming Lips released a CD single entitled "This Here Giraffe" on the world's first-ever star-shaped CD.  It was in the shape of an 8-pointed star. The North American release of the soundtrack to the Nintendo 64 game Yoshi's Story, titled "Music to Pound the Ground To", is also a shaped CD. In this instance, the shape is an outline of the print on the disc, Yoshi's face and some fruit in the background. The North American soundtrack of Diddy Kong Racing, another Nintendo 64 game, has a similarly-shaped CD, being shaped to outline Diddy Kong's head.

An additional  example is the live EP Alive in Torment released by symphonic black metal band Dimmu Borgir. The disc is shaped like a skull.

British death metal band Carcass released a limited edition of Swansong as a brain-shaped CD.

Compatibility
Shaped CDs are not compatible with all CD players. They work with most machines where the disc is inserted by manually clipping it onto a spindle (the mechanism in virtually all portable CD players), but may not work in drives that load the disc from a tray and they are not compatible with any slot-loading drives. They can even get stuck in these players or be rejected if the tray-loading mechanism has optical sensors to detect the disc position.

Business card CDs or shaped CDs can hold any type of data and can usually store anywhere from 40MB to 100MB of information. These CDs may be used for promotional pieces for business, music or many other uses.

Asymmetric discs
Irregularly shaped, non-rotationally-symmetric discs with an offset center of mass may also cause damaging vibration if played in computer CD drives, which can operate at a much higher rotational velocity than stand-alone audio CD players. Some irregularly shaped discs work with tray-loading CD drives if they include a circular ridge on their underside that centers them on the part of the tray designed to hold 80 mm CDs, if the tray has such a feature.

Legal/patent
A patent exists on the production of all non-round CDs.  Often referred to as the "Rose Patent," the holder of this patent has litigated to collect royalties on the production or sale of any non-round disc.  Other manufacturers of non-round discs have litigated to dispute the validity of this patent and have produced examples of non-round discs that predate the patent.  The matter is currently in litigation. Observation of the aforementioned patent has determined that it is only in regards to magnetic media and further citations may be needed to verify its application to CD optical media.

See also
Bootable business card
Unusual types of gramophone records#Unusually shaped discs

References

Compact disc